Ruth Posner  (née Wajsberg; born 20 April 1933) is a Polish-born British Holocaust survivor, former dancer and choreographer and is today an actress and a former member of the Royal Shakespeare Company.

Early life 
Born in Warsaw in Poland and an only child, her father was a non-observant Polish Jew who had been a local government official before World War II during which she and her parents were sent to the Warsaw Ghetto. In 1942 her father arranged for Ruth and her aunt to go to work at a Jewish-owned leather factory outside the ghetto walls, and from here they both escaped. Posner survived the remainder of the war by pretending to be a young Polish Catholic girl called Irena Slabowska. She was aided in this deception by the fact that she and her parents had always spoken Polish together rather than Yiddish. It is believed that her parents were murdered in Treblinka.

As a nine-year old, she was faced with a life-or-death decision: She knew that if she tried to break out that she would most likely be shot or die anyway staying at the ghetto. She and her aunt took that risk and escaped, making it out of the ghetto walls alive. As for Posner's parents, they did not. Posner has an idea of what happened to her parents, but unable to verify it. Posner experienced another tragedy at the age of thirteen. Her hometown Warsaw was evacuated and she was moved to Germany. At that time, she was still known as "the little Catholic girl". She was taken as a prisoner of war to Germany, not as a Jew. Being a prisoner in Germany was not as bad as being a child in the concentration camps. In Germany, she was tortured but not beaten. After the war with Germany was over she moved to England and has lived there ever since. In the last 25 years in England she has re-enacted her life in a play called "Who Do We Think We Are," choreographed plays, acted in celebrated movies, danced, and written a book.

Arriving in the United Kingdom as a refugee at the end of World War II, she married Michael S. Posner in 1950. In the 1950s she became a dancer and choreographer with the London Contemporary Dance School. When in the early 1970s her husband went to New York to work for UNICEF Posner went with him and taught Physical Theatre at the Juilliard School in New York, and Brandeis University in Boston. During her nine years in the United States she trained as an actor with Uta Hagen, and gained an MA in Theatre Arts at Hunter College in 1980. On returning to London she taught Physical Theatre at the London Academy of Music and Dramatic Art, the Royal Academy of Dramatic Art, and the Central School of Speech and Drama.

Career 
Later she concentrated on an acting career, and on television she appeared in Making News (1990), Love Hurts (1994), The Ruth Rendell Mysteries (1995), Bramwell (1997), To Anyone Who Can Hear Me (1999), Casualty (1987–2003), The Bill (2003), Coming Up for Air (2003), Timeless (2005), Apparitions (2008) and The Pharmacist (2012). In 2013, she was one of the main cast members in series 1 of Count Arthur Strong.

Her film appearances include Leon the Pig Farmer (1992), Do I Love You? (2002) The Football Factory (2004) and Shemira (2017) . Stage roles include Hiawatha at the Bristol Old Vic (1991–92), The Dybbuk for the Royal Shakespeare Company (1992), The Tempest with the Actors Touring Company (1999), Woman in the Moon at the Arcola Theatre (2001), Ritual in Blood at the Nottingham Playhouse (2001) and Seven Jewish Children (2009) at the Royal Court Theatre.

She speaks Polish, German, Italian and Hebrew.

Personal life 
Posner worked at the London Contemporary Dance Company for 17 years, where she eventually met her husband Michael S. Posner. She and Michael had one son, who died at the age of 37. She and her husband have lived in England for the last 25 years.

She was awarded the British Empire Medal (BEM) in the 2022 New Year Honours for services to Holocaust education and awareness.

Published works
Ruth always wanted to be a dancer and danced most of her life. She felt life through her dancing. During her 40s she decided to switch from dance to drama. Many people told her she wasn't going to "make it" in the theatre world because of her thick accent. Posner proved people wrong and became a popular actress. She has appeared in a Holocaust play about her life called Who Do We Think We Are? Along with drama and dancing she also wrote her autobiography, Bits and Pieces of My Life. The book mainly shares many descriptions of her Holocaust experiences and life after.

References

External links

[https://www.theguardian.com/culture/2001/mar/19/artsfeatures1 My best acting was in the war'] – The Guardian'' 19 March 2001
Posner on actors.mandy.com
 Agent Roger Carey

1933 births
Polish emigrants to the United Kingdom
Warsaw Ghetto inmates
Jewish British actresses
British people of Polish-Jewish descent
British television actresses
British film actresses
British stage actresses
Royal Shakespeare Company members
Hunter College alumni
Living people
Naturalised citizens of the United Kingdom
Recipients of the British Empire Medal